Shavar Tahrel Newkirk (born May 6, 1996) is an American professional basketball player for NSH Mountain Gold Timika of the Indonesian Basketball League. He played college basketball for Saint Joseph's.

Early life
Newkirk is the son of Sharied Newkirk and grew up in Harlem. He began playing basketball at the age of five and immediately began to love the game. He attended Cardinal Hayes High School after transferring from Rice High School. As a senior at Cardinal Hayes, Newkirk averaged 18.7 points per game and led the team to back-to-back CHSAA intersectional semifinals appearances. He was named New York Daily News Bronx player of the year in 2014.

College career
Newkirk averaged 8 points per game as a sophomore at Saint Joseph's. He was the starting point guard on a team led by star DeAndre' Bembry that won the Atlantic 10 Conference and reached the 2016 NCAA Tournament. As a junior, Newkirk averaged a team-high 20.3 points per game in the first 12 games. However, he was lost for the season due to a torn anterior cruciate ligament he suffered during a 69–63 victory over George Washington. Newkirk averaged 17.4 points, 4.3 rebounds and 3.9 assists per game as a senior. He was named to the Second-team All-Atlantic 10 and All-Big 5 Team. He graduated from Saint Joseph's with a degree in sports marketing.

Professional career
In August 2018 Newkirk signed his first professional contract with the Halifax Hurricanes of the National Basketball League of Canada. He was cit on October 30. On December 25, 2018, Newkirk signed with FC Schalke 04 Basketball of the German ProA league. In August 2020 Newkirk signed with Höttur which was promoted to the Icelandic Premier League after being on top in the Men's 1. Division when the season was cut short due to the COVID-19 outbreak. In November 2020, the club released Newkirk after the league had been stopped for a month due to a new COVID-19 outbreak in Iceland. In January 2022, Newkirk signed with NSH Mountain Gold Timika of the Indonesian Basketball League. Shavar Newkirk averaged 21.9 PPG, 9 rebounds, 4,8 assists, and 2.2 steals in the 2022 IBL Season. Eventually, Shavar would then win the Best Foreign Player award for the 2022 IBL Season.

References

External links 
Saint Joseph's Hawks bio
Twitter
Indonesian Basketball League profile

1996 births
Living people
American expatriate basketball people in Canada
American expatriate basketball people in Germany
American expatriate basketball people in Iceland
American expatriate basketball people in Indonesia
American men's basketball players
Basketball players from New York City
Cardinal Hayes High School alumni
FC Schalke 04 Basketball players
Höttur men's basketball players
Point guards
Saint Joseph's Hawks men's basketball players
Sportspeople from the Bronx